Steve Almond (born October 27, 1966) is an American short-story writer, essayist and author of ten books, three of which are self-published.

Life
Almond was raised in Palo Alto, California, graduated from Henry M. Gunn High School and received his undergraduate degree from Wesleyan University. He spent seven years as a newspaper reporter, mostly in El Paso and at the Miami New Times.

Almond lives in Arlington, Massachusetts with his wife and three children.

Literary work
Almond's 2014 book Against Football, which documents his growing disillusionment with American football, derived from two pieces written for The New York Times. Almond's second book, Candyfreak (2005) was a New York Times Best Seller and won the American Library Association Alex Award and was named the Booksense Adult Nonfiction Book of the Year.

Almond's books have been published in half a dozen foreign countries and translated into German, Dutch, Spanish, and Croatian. He has published more than 150 stories in magazines such as Tin House, Playboy, Zoetrope, and Ploughshares. His story "Donkey Greedy, Donkey Gets Punched" was selected for The Best American Short Stories 2010 and has been optioned for film by Spilt Milk Entertainment.

Two of his stories were published in The Pushcart Prize. His essays and journalism have appeared in venues such as The New York Times Magazine, GQ, The Wall Street Journal, Poets & Writers, and Real Simple. His stories and essays have appeared in dozens of anthologies. Almond also reviews books for The New York Times, The Boston Globe, and the Los Angeles Times. He regularly teaches at GrubStreet in Boston, at the Sanibel Writer's Conference, and the Tin House Writer's Conference.

Teaching
Almond teaches non-fiction to fellows in the Nieman Fellowship program, based in Cambridge, Massachusetts.

Political activities
Almond served as adjunct professor in creative writing at Boston College for five years until publishing an open letter of resignation in The Boston Globe on May 12, 2006, in which he explained that his resignation was intended to protest the selection of Condoleezza Rice as the college's 2006 commencement guest speaker. He later appeared on the Hannity & Colmes show on Fox News to discuss his decision. Almond is a regular contributor to The New York Times Magazines Riff section, and to the literary website The Rumpus, where he writes frequently about the intersection of morality and politics titled "The Week in Greed." Almond's January 2023 interview with Laura Ingraham in support of Against Football abruptly ended after he made an unwelcome comparison between the economic pressure on Fox that forced Ingraham to apologize for a tasteless tweet to the economic pressure needed on owners to make professional football safer for players.

Self-publishing
After a decade of working with traditional publishers, Almond has self-published three books in recent years and become an outspoken advocate of self-publishing, which he has written about extensively in the Los Angeles Times, Poets & Writers, and The Rumpus.

Almond was a contributing writer to Alarm Clock Theatre Company's Elliot Norton Award-winning play PS Page Me Later based on selections from Found Magazine.

Radio and podcast
Almond is a regular correspondent on NPR's Here & Now and on WGBH, both based in Boston. On October 27, 2011, Almond appeared as a guest on the podcast WTF with Marc Maron. Almond also hosted a live interview podcast series with Hallelujah the Hills band leader Ryan Walsh entitled "This Has Been A Disaster – Thanks For Having Us." Almond co-hosted the Dear Sugars podcast for four years with Cheryl Strayed.

Bibliography

Short stories
 My Life in Heavy Metal, Atlantic/Grove; Random House UK; Verlag Kiepenheuer & Witsch Germany, Fokus Komunikacije Croatia, 2002
 The Evil B.B. Chow and Other Stories, Algonquin Books, 2005
 God Bless America: Stories, Lookout Press, 2011
 Writs of Passion, DIY or Die Press, 2013.

Nonfiction
 Candyfreak: A Journey through the Chocolate Underbelly of America, Algonquin Books, 2004.
 (Not That You Asked) Rants, Exploits and Obsessions, Random House, September 11, 2007.
 Letters from People Who Hate Me, DIY or Die Press, self-published with Espresso Book Machine, 2010.
 Rock and Roll Will Save Your Life, Random House, 2010.
 This Won't Take But a Minute, Honey, self-published.
 Bad Poetry, DIY or Die Press.
 Against Football: One Fan's Reluctant Manifesto, Melville House Publishing, 2014.
 Bad Stories: What the Hell Just Happened to this Country, Red Hen Press, 2018.
 William Stoner and the Battle for the Inner Life: Bookmarked, Ig Publishing, 2019.

Fiction
 All the Secrets of the World, (Zando, 2022)

Coauthor
 Which Brings Me to You: A Novel in Confessions (with Julianna Baggott), Algonquin Books, 2006

References

External links
 
August 2003 Interview
Boston College resignation letter
Op-ed piece in The Boston Globe
Video of Steve Almond interview on Fox television show RedEye
Midnight on Them Spurs
The Problem of Human Consumption
Skull

American short story writers
Living people
People from Palo Alto, California
Wesleyan University alumni
1966 births
Gunn High School alumni